The Routzahn-Miller Farmstead is a historic home and farm complex located at Middletown, Frederick County, Maryland, United States. It consists of a Federal style-influenced brick house and smokehouse, both built about 1825; a later frame out-kitchen / washhouse; a standard Pennsylvania barn; a 20th-century dairy barn and milk house; and a 20th-century equipment shed. The Pennsylvania barn was probably built in the late 19th century and was recently rehabilitated for use as a preschool. The complex is located on a  parcel on the east flank of South Mountain. It is representative example of a type of domestic and agricultural grouping which characterized the rural mid-Maryland region from the early 19th century through World War II era.

The Routzahn-Miller Farmstead was listed on the National Register of Historic Places in 2006.

References

External links
, including photo from 2004, at Maryland Historical Trust

Houses on the National Register of Historic Places in Maryland
Houses in Frederick County, Maryland
Houses completed in 1825
Federal architecture in Maryland
Greek Revival houses in Maryland
National Register of Historic Places in Frederick County, Maryland